King's College School, Panama is a British international school in Clayton, Panama City, Panama. For students aged 2 to 18 years old. It is operated by the King's Group.

References

External links

 

International schools in Panama
British international schools in North America
Educational institutions established in 2012
2012 establishments in Panama